The 2004 congressional elections in Minnesota were held on November 2, 2004 to determine who would represent the state of Minnesota in the United States House of Representatives.

Minnesota had eight seats in the House, apportioned according to the 2000 United States Census.  Representatives are elected for two-year terms; those elected served in the 109th Congress from January 3, 2005 until January 3, 2007.  The election coincided with the 2004 presidential election. All of the incumbents who represented Minnesota in the United States House of Representative in the 108th Congress were re-elected to the 109th Congress.

Overview

District 1

Incumbent Republican Gil Gutknecht, who had represented Minnesota's 1st congressional district since 1994, ran against Leigh Pomeroy of the DFL and Gregory Mikkelson of the Independence Party. Gutknecht easily won a fifth term, defeating second-place Pomeroy by a comfortable 24 percent margin, as Mikkelson placed at an even more distant third.

DFL primary

Candidates
 Leigh Pomeroy, university professor

Results

Independence primary

Candidates
 Gregory Mikkelson
 David Pechulis

Results

Republican primary

Candidates
 Gil Gutknecht, incumbent U.S. Representative since 1994

Results

General election

Results

District 2

Incumbent Republican John Kline, who was first elected in 2002, ran against Teresa Daly of the DFL and Doug Williams of the Independence Party. Kline won a second term, defeating Daly by a 16 percent margin, as Williams finished a very distant third.

DFL primary

Candidates
 Teresa Daly, Burnsville City Councilor

Results

Independence primary

Candidates
 Doug Williams

Results

Republican primary

Candidates
 John Kline, incumbent U.S. Representative since 2003

Results

General election

Results

District 3

Incumbent Republican Jim Ramstad, who was first elected in 1990, faced a primary challenge from Burton Hanson, but won renomination by a margin of nearly 80 percent in the Republican primary. In the general election, Ramstad defeated DFL challenger Deborah Watts, easily winning election to his eighth term in Congress.

DFL primary

Candidates
 Deborah Watts

Results

Republican primary

Candidates
 Burton Hanson
 Jim Ramstad, incumbent U.S. Representative since 1991

Results

General election

Results

District 4

Incumbent DFLer Betty McCollum, who was first elected in 2000, faced off against Patrice Bataglia of the Republican Party of Minnesota and Peter F. Vento of the Independence Party of Minnesota. Defeating Bataglia by a comfortable 24 percent margin, McCollum easily won re-election to her third term in Congress, as Vento finished a distant third

DFL primary

Candidates
 Betty McCollum, incumbent U.S. Representative since 2001

Results

Independence primary

Candidates
 Bob Cardinal
 Peter F. Vento

Results

Republican primary

Candidates
 Patrice Bataglia, Dakota County commissioner
 Jack Shepard, fugitive, alleged arsonist, and former Minneapolis dentist who fled the country after allegedly attempting to burn down his own dental office

Results

General election

Results

District 5

Incumbent DFLer Martin Sabo, who was first elected in 1978, was challenged for the nomination by Dick Franson, but Sabo won the primary election by a landslide 82 percent margin. In the general election, Sabo had no difficulty winning his 14th term in Congress, defeating Republican challenger Daniel Mathias by a margin of more than 45 percent, while Green candidate Jay Pond finished a distant third.

DFL primary

Candidates
 "Dick" Franson, perennial candidate
 Martin Olav Sabo, incumbent U.S. Representative

Results

Green primary

Candidates
 Jay Pond

Results

Republican primary

Candidates
 Daniel Mathias

Results

General election

Results

District 6

Incumbent Republican Mark Kennedy, who was first elected in 2000, encountered little difficulty winning his third term in Congress, although the election in Minnesota's 6th congressional district was by far the closest congressional election in Minnesota in 2004. Kennedy defeated his DFL challenger, child safety advocate Patty Wetterling, by a margin of about 8 percent.

DFL primary

Candidates
 Patty Wetterling, child safety advocate, and mother of kidnapping and murder victim Jacob Wetterling

Results

Republican primary

Candidates
 Mark Kennedy, incumbent U.S. Representative since 2001

Results

General election

Results

District 7

Incumbent DFLer Collin Peterson, who was first elected in 1990, faced no difficulty winning his eighth term in Congress, defeating Republican challenger David Sturrock by a landslide 32 percent margin.

DFL primary

Candidates
 Collin C. Peterson, incumbent U.S. Representative since 1991

Results

Republican primary

Candidates
 David E. Sturrock

Results

General election

Results

District 8

Incumbent DFLer Jim Oberstar, who was first elected in 1974, was challenged for the nomination by Michael H. Johnson, but Oberstar won the primary election by a landslide 71 percent margin. In the general election, Oberstar had no difficulty winning his 16th term in Congress, defeating Republican challenger Mark Groettum by a margin of more than 33 percent, while Green candidate Van Presley finished a very distant third.

DFL primary

Candidates
 Michael H. Johnson
 James L. Oberstar, incumbent U.S. Representative since 1975

Results

Green primary

Candidates
 Van Presley

Results

Republican primary

Candidates
 Mark Groettum

Results

General election

Results

References

2004
Minnesota
2004 Minnesota elections